Further or Furthur may refer to:

Furthur (bus), the Merry Pranksters' psychedelic bus
Further (band), a 1990s American indie rock band
Furthur (band), a band formed in 2009 by Bob Weir and Phil Lesh
Further (The Chemical Brothers album), 2010
Further (Flying Saucer Attack album), 1995
Further (Geneva album), 1997, and a song from the album
Further (Richard Hawley album), 2019
Further (Solace album), 2000
Further (Outasight album), 2009
"Further" (VNV Nation song), a song by VNV Nation
"Further", a song by Longview from the album Mercury, 2003